The Roman Catholic Diocese of Jaén  is a diocese in the city of Jaén in the ecclesiastical province of Granada in Spain.

History
 7th century: Established as Diocese of Jaén

Leadership
Bishops of Jaén (Roman rite)
Domingo, O.P. (1236–1248 Died) 
. . .
Pedro Pascual, O. de M. (27 Feb 1296 – 6 Dec 1300 Died)
. . . 
Alfonso Vázquez de Acuña (1457–1474 Died)
Iñigo Manrique de Lara (archbishop) (1475 – 15 Jan 1483 Appointed Archbishop of Sevilla)
Luis Osorio (1483–1496 Died)
Diego de Deza, O.P. (14 Feb 1498 – 7 Feb 1500 Appointed Bishop of Palencia) 
Alonso Suárez de la Fuente del Sauce (1500–1520 Died)
Esteban Gabriel Merino (12 Jun 1523 – 28 Jul 1535 Died) 
Alessandro Farnese (cardinal) (30 Jul 1535 – 6 Jul 1537 Resigned) 
Francisco Mendoza (bishop of Jaén) (14 Jun 1538 – 1543 Died) 
Pedro Pacheco de Villena (Ladrón de Guevara) (9 Jan 1545 – 30 Apr 1554 Appointed Bishop of Sigüenza) 
Diego Tavera Ponce de Léon (17 Jul 1555 – 28 Apr 1560 Died)
Diego de los Cobos Molina (4 Sep 1560 – 8 Sep 1565 Died) 
Francisco Delgado López (bishop) (26 Apr 1566 – 2 Oct 1576 Died)
Diego Deza Tello (11 Sep 1577 – 13 Sep 1579 Died) 
Francisco Sarmiento Mendoza (27 May 1580 – 9 Jun 1595 Died) 
Bernardo de Sandoval y Rojas (29 Apr 1596 – 19 Apr 1599 Appointed Archbishop of Toledo) 
Sancho Dávila Toledo (10 Jan 1600 – 20 Jul 1615 Appointed Bishop of Sigüenza) 
Francisco Martínez de Cenicero (3 Aug 1615 – 28 Nov 1617 Died) 
Baltasar Moscoso y Sandoval (29 Apr 1619 – 28 May 1646 Appointed Archbishop of Toledo)
Juan Queipo de Llano Flores (18 Feb 1647 – 1 Nov 1647 Died) 
Fernando Andrade Castro (6 Jul 1648 – 21 Feb 1664 Died) 
Antonio Peña Hermosa (11 Aug 1664 – 19 Jul 1667 Died) 
Jerónimo Rodríguez de Valderas, O. de M. (9 Apr 1668 – 7 Mar 1671 Died) 
Antonio Fernández del Campo Angulo y Velasco (1 Jul 1671 – 23 Dec 1681 Died) 
Juan Asensio Barrios, O. de M. (20 Apr 1682 – 22 Apr 1692 Died) 
Antonio de Brizuela y Salamanca (13 Apr 1693 – 10 Jan 1708 Died) 
Benito Omañana (24 Sep 1708 – 19 Mar 1712 Died) 
Rodrigo Marín y Rubio (28 May 1714 – 10 Feb 1732 Died) 
Manuel Isidro Orozco Manrique de Lara (21 Jul 1732 – 5 May 1738 Appointed Archbishop of Santiago de Compostela) 
Andrés Cabrejas Molina (5 May 1738 – 4 Sep 1746 Died) 
Francisco Castillo Vintimilla (31 Jul 1747 – 15 Nov 1749 Died) 
Benito Marín, O.S.B. (27 Apr 1750 – 10 Aug 1769 Died) 
Antonio Gómez de la Torre y Jaraveitia (28 May 1770 – 23 Mar 1779 Died) 
Agustín Rubín Cevallos (18 Sep 1780 – 8 Feb 1793 Died) 
Pedro Rubio-Benedicto Herrero (21 Feb 1794 – 27 May 1795 Died) 
Diego Melo Portugal, O.S.A. (18 Dec 1795 – 22 Jan 1816 Died) 
Andrés Esteban y Gómez (22 Jul 1816 – 17 Jun 1831 Died) 
Diego Martínez Carlón y Teruel (24 Feb 1832 – 28 Aug 1836 Died) 
José Escolano y Fenoi (17 Dec 1847 – 21 Jul 1854 Died) 
Tomás Roda y Rodríguez (25 Sep 1857 – 11 Mar 1858 Died) 
Andrés Rosales y Muñoz (25 Jun 1858 – 22 Sep 1864 Confirmed Bishop of Almería) 
Antolín Monescillo y Viso (27 Mar 1865 – 22 Jun 1877 Confirmed Archbishop of Valencia) 
Manuel María León González y Sánchez (22 Jun 1877 – 20 Oct 1896 Died) 
Victoriano Guisasola y Menéndez (19 Apr 1897 – 16 Dec 1901 Appointed Bishop of Madrid) 
Salvador Castellote y Pinazo (16 Dec 1901 – 6 Dec 1906 Appointed Archbishop of Sevilla) 
Juan José Laguarda y Fenollera (6 Dec 1906 – 29 Apr 1909 Confirmed Bishop of Barcelona) 
Juan Manuel Sanz y Saravia (29 Apr 1909 – 19 Jun 1919 Died) 
Manuel Basulto y Jiménez (18 Dec 1919 – 12 Aug 1936 Died) 
Rafael García y García de Castro (29 Dec 1942 – 9 May 1953 Appointed Archbishop of Granada) 
Felix Romero Menjibar (16 Jan 1954 – 2 Jul 1970 Appointed Archbishop of Valladolid) 
Miguel Peinado Peinado (30 Apr 1971 – 31 May 1988 Retired) 
Santiago García Aracil (31 May 1988 – 9 Jul 2004 Appointed Archbishop of Mérida-Badajoz) 
Ramón del Hoyo López (19 May 2005 – 9 April 2016)
Amadeo Rodríguez Magro (9 April 2016 – 25 October 2021)
Sebastián Chico Martínez (25 October 2021 – present)

See also
La Magdalena church, Jaén
Roman Catholicism in Spain

References

Sources
 Catholic Hierarchy

Roman Catholic dioceses in Spain
Dioceses established in the 7th century